Miroslav Zikmund (14 February 1919 – 1 December 2021) was a Czech travel writer and explorer.

Biography

After earning his Matura in 1938, Zikmund entered university, but was unable to graduate until 1946 due to World War II. He studied alongside Jiří Hanzelka, with whom he would complete his lifelong travels. The two became known as Hanzelka and Zikmund and made multiple films on their experiences.

Miroslav Zikmund died in Prague on 1 December 2021 at the age of almost 103.

Filmography

 Afrika I. – Z Maroka na Kilimandžáro (1952)
 Afrika II. – Od rovníku ke Stolové hoře (1953)
 Z Argentiny do Mexika (1953)
 Kašmír: Je-li kde na světě ráj (1961)

References

1919 births 

2021 deaths
Film people from Plzeň
Czech non-fiction writers
Czech photographers
Czech film directors
Czech explorers
Writers from Plzeň
Czech travel writers
Czech centenarians
Men centenarians